The Daily Territorial is a daily (Monday-Friday) newspaper in Tucson, Arizona, United States, covering local legal business news. Pima County's legal paper of record, it lists legal notices filed within the county as well as some business news.

References

External links
Daily Territorial

Mass media in Pima County, Arizona
Newspapers published in Arizona